Kormakino is a rural locality (a village) in Pyatovskoye Rural Settlement, Totemsky  District, Vologda Oblast, Russia. The population was 30 as of 2002.

Geography 
Kormakino is located 14 km northeast of Totma (the district's administrative centre) by road. Matveyevo is the nearest rural locality.

References 

Rural localities in Tarnogsky District